A spectral energy distribution (SED) is a plot of energy versus frequency or wavelength of light (not to be confused with a 'spectrum' of flux density vs frequency or wavelength).  It is used in many branches of astronomy to characterize astronomical sources.  For example, in radio astronomy they are used to show the emission from synchrotron radiation, free-free emission and other emission mechanisms.  In infrared astronomy, SEDs can be used to classify young stellar objects.

Detector for spectral energy distribution
The count rates observed from a given astronomical radiation source have no simple relationship to the flux from that source, such as might be incident at the top of the Earth's atmosphere. This lack of a simple relationship is due in no small part to the complex properties of radiation detectors.

These detector properties can be divided into
those that merely attenuate the beam, including
residual atmosphere between source and detector,
absorption in the detector window when present,
quantum efficiency of the detecting medium,
those that redistribute the beam in detected energy, such as
fluorescent photon escape phenomena,
inherent energy resolution of the detector.

See also

 Astronomical radio source
 Astronomical X-ray sources
 Background radiation
 Bremsstrahlung
 Cosmic microwave background spectral distortions
 Cyclotron radiation
 Electromagnetic radiation
 Synchrotron radiation
 Wavelength dispersive X-ray spectroscopy

References

Further reading

External links
The High Energy Astrophysics Science Archive Research Center (HEASARC) at NASA
The Science of Spectroscopy

Applied and interdisciplinary physics
Observational astronomy
Optical phenomena
Radiation
Scattering
Spectroscopy